Stanley "Stan" Fearnley (birth registered first ¼ 1947) is an English former professional rugby league footballer who played in the 1960s and 1970s.

Background
Fearnley's birth was registered in Bradford district, West Riding of Yorkshire, England.

Playing career

International honours
Stan Fearnley won a cap, and played  in England's 0-25 defeat by Australia in the 1975 Rugby League World Cup Final at Headingley Rugby Stadium, Leeds on 12 November 1975.

Challenge Cup Final appearances
Stan Fearnley played , and scored a try in Bradford Northern's 14-33 defeat by Featherstone Rovers in the 1973 Challenge Cup Final during the 1972–73 season at Wembley Stadium, London on Saturday 12 May 1973, in front of a crowd of 72,395, and played  (replaced by interchange/substitute Roy Dickinson) in Leeds' 16-7 victory over Widnes in the 1977 Challenge Cup Final during the 1976–77 season at Wembley Stadium, London on Saturday 7 May 1977, in front of a crowd of 80,871.

Player's No.6 Trophy Final appearances
Stan Fearnley played  in Bradford Northern's 3-2 victory over Widnes in the 1974–75 Player's No.6 Trophy Final during the 1974–75 season at Wilderspool Stadium, Warrington on Saturday 25 January 1975.

Career at Bradford Northern
Stan Fearnley - son of the coach and general manager Albert Fearnley - was the next  to emerge at Odsal, having pace and footballing skills. He played for Bradford Northern from 1964 to 1977, scoring 41 tries in 217 games.

References

External links

1947 births
Living people
Bradford Bulls players
England national rugby league team players
English rugby league players
Leeds Rhinos players
Rugby league locks
Rugby league players from Bradford